Apaturris expeditionis is a species of sea snail, a marine gastropod mollusk in the family Borsoniidae.

Description
(Original description) The shell is broadly fusiform and broadest about the middle The aperture is equal in length to the spire. The 6½ whorls are flattened. The suture is impressed. The body whorl is ventricose and regularly tapered in front. The aperture is long, oblique and posteriorly deflected to the right. The acute outer lip is not thin. The sinus is near the suture, deep and shows a thick rim. The thin inner lip is broad. The columella is flattened, and has two obscure plications near the middle. The canal is short, wide and truncate in front.

Sculpture: The smooth protoconch consists of 1½ whorls. The first adult whorl has 2 spiral threads on the periphery, 2nd with 10 sinuous axial ridges overridden by fine spiral threads. The succeeding two whorls are similarly sculptured, the axial ridges and spiral threads being more numerous. The body whorl shows low axial ridges, sinuous near the suture and becoming obsolete at the periphery, the whole overridden by close regular spiral threads.

Colour : Dark buff, a faint purple spiral band on the lower edge of the spire whorls. On the bodv whorl are sinuous brown marks near the suture.

Height, 5–2 mm. Diameter, 2–2 mm.

Variations from type. – The colour varies from white to buff, most shells being ornamented with a few irregular brown marks. 
 
Habitat. – Dead shells dredged in 10 m. to 30 m. on gravelly bottom off Sunday Island.

Distribution
This marine species is endemic to New Zealand and occurs off the Kermadec Islands in gravel at depths between 31 m and 47 m.
.

References

External links
 Tom Iredale (1917), More Molluscan Name-Changes, Generic and Specific; Oxford Journals Science & Mathematics Journal of Molluscan Studies Volume 12, Issue 6 Pp. 322-330
  Spencer H.G., Willan R.C., Marshall B.A. & Murray T.J. (2011) Checklist of the Recent Mollusca Recorded from the New Zealand Exclusive Economic Zone

Apaturris
Gastropods described in 1915
Gastropods of New Zealand